Siphocranion is a genus of plants in the family Lamiaceae, first described in 1929. It is native to China, the Himalayas, and northern Indochina.

Species
 Siphocranion macranthum (Hook.f.) C.Y.Wu - Assam, Arunachal Pradesh, Bhutan, Myanmar, Thailand, Guangxi, Guizhou, Sichuan, Tibet, Yunnan 
 Siphocranion nudipes (Hemsl.) Kudô - Fujian, Guangdong, Guizhou, Hubei, Jiangxi, Sichuan, Yunnan

References

Lamiaceae
Lamiaceae genera